{{Infobox person
|name=Steffan Rhodri
|image= 
|caption=
|birth_date = 
|birth_place= Swansea, Wales
|occupation= Actor
|notable_works= Gavin & Stacey Harry Potter and the Deathly Hallows – Part 1 Ni no Kuni: Wrath of the White Witch
|years active= 1995–present
}}
Steffan Rhodri (born 1 March 1967) is a Welsh film actor, best known for portraying Dave Coaches on Gavin & Stacey, Reg Cattermole in Harry Potter and the Deathly Hallows – Part 1 and as the voice of Drippy in Ni no Kuni: Wrath of the White Witch.

Filmography
Film work
 Twin Town (1997) – Hunky
 Solomon and Gaenor (1999) – Noah Jones
 Ali G Indahouse (2002) – School Teacher
 Cymru Fach (2008)
 The Big I Am (2010) – DS Moseley
 Submarine (2010) – Mr. Davey
 Harry Potter and the Deathly Hallows: Part 1 (2010) – Reg CattermoleReg Cattermole in movies.
 Ironclad (2011) – Cooper
 Under Milk Wood (2015) – Mog Edwards
 Wonder Woman (2017) – Colonel Darnell
 Last Summer (2018) – Sgt Morgan
 Don't Breathe 2 (2021) – The Surgeon

TV work

 Pobol y Cwm (1995–1996, 1998, BBC) – Jon Markham
 A Mind to Kill (1997, S4C/Channel 5) – Young Sir Isaac Gwillym
 Tales from Pleasure Beach (2001, BBC) – Wes
 Con Passionate (2005, S4C) – Andy
 Wire in the Blood (2005, ITV) – Bill Denton
 Heartbeat (2007, ITV) – Frank Jepson
 Belonging (2008) – Ed
 Giles Wemmbley Hogg Goes Off.... to Glastonbury (2007, TV Movie)
 Gavin & Stacey (2007–2010, BBC) – Dave Coaches
 Doctors (2010, BBC) – Gerry Cutler
 Pen Talar (2010, S4C) – Phillip Harrison
 Teulu (2010)
 4Music (2011–present, Channel 4) – Narrator
 Father Brown (2012, BBC) – Christy Nolan
 Hinterland (2013, S4C/BBC) – Herbert Rees
 Under Milk Wood (2014, BBC) – Mr. Waldo
 A Touch of Cloth (2014, SKY) – Eddie Huffway
 Cara Fi (2014) – Vic Reed
 Cucumber (2015, Channel 4) – Don Baxter
 The Hollow Crown (2016, BBC) – Oxford
 Apple Tree Yard (2017, BBC) – DI Cleveland
 Shorts: The Pines (2017, by Gary Owen) (starring Steffan Rhodri)
 Three Girls (2017, BBC) – Fraser Lavery
 Keeping Faith (2017–2019, BBC) – Judge Gwyn Daniels
 A Very English Scandal (2018, BBC) – D.C.S Michael Challes
 Manhunt (2019, ITV) – DC Neil Jones
 Temple (2019, SKY) – Jeremy
 Wild Bill (2019, ITV) – DS Alex Blair
 The Last Kingdom (2020, Netflix) – King Hywel
 We Hunt Together (2020, Alibi) – Larry
 In My Skin (2021, BBC)  Perry
 House of the Dragon (2022) – Hobert Hightower

Theatre

 Abigail's Party – play by Mike Leigh (Hampstead Theatre, London, England, UK); 2002–2003
 The Birthday Party- Clwyd Theatr Cymru; 2006
 The Father- Chichester; 2006
 Great Expectations – Clwyd Theatr Cymru; 2009
 Mary Stuart- Clwyd Theatr Cymru; 2009
 Clybourne Park – Russ/Dan; by Bruce Norris; Royal Court Theatre, London; 2010
 The Kitchen Sink- by Tom Wells; Bush Theatre; 2011
 Absent Friends- by Alan Ayckborn; West End; 2012
 Posh- by Laura Wade; West End; 2012
 It's a Mad World My Masters ; Middleton; Royal Shakespeare Company; 2013
 Candide- by Mark Ravenhill; Royal Shakespeare Company; 2013
 I'd Rather Goya Robbed Me Of My Sleep Than Some Other Arsehole- by Federico Garcia; Gate Theatre; 2014
 The Mentalists by Richard Bean; West End; 2015
 The Hairy Ape by Eugene O'Neill; The Old Vic; 2015
 Walter Harrison in This House by James Graham; Garrick Theatre; 2016–2017
 Killer Joe by Tracy Letts at Trafalgar Studios; 2018

Video games

 Ni no Kuni: Wrath of the White Witch (2013) – Drippy (voice)

Audio drama

He has also guest-starred in a number of Doctor Who spin-off audio plays produced by Big Finish Productions. These include Dreamtime, The Bone of Contention and as the British Prime Minister in UNIT: The Longest Night and UNIT: The Wasting''.

References

External links

1967 births
Living people
Welsh-speaking actors
Welsh male film actors
Welsh male television actors
Male actors from Swansea
20th-century Welsh male actors
21st-century Welsh male actors
People educated at Ysgol Gyfun Ystalyfera